Trumbauersville is a borough in Bucks County, Pennsylvania, United States. The population was 974 at the 2010 census.

Geography
Trumbauersville is located at  (40.411305, -75.381577).

Demographics

As of the 2010 census, the borough was 95.4% White, 0.6% Black or African American, 0.3% Native American, 0.8% Asian, 0.1% Native Hawaiian or Other Pacific Islander, and 0.6% were two or more races. 3.1% of the population were of Hispanic or Latino ancestry.

As of the census of 2000, there were 1,059 people, 374 households, and 305 families residing in the borough. The population density was 2,475.2 people per square mile (950.9/km²). There were 382 housing units at an average density of 892.8 per square mile (343.0/km²). The racial makeup of the borough was 97.92% White, 0.57% African American, 0.66% Asian, 0.47% from other races, and 0.38% from two or more races. Hispanic or Latino of any race were 0.85% of the population.

There were 666 households, out of which 39.8% had children under the age of 18 living with them, 69.0% were married couples living together, 7.8% had a female householder with no husband present, and 18.4% were non-families. 13.6% of all households were made up of individuals, and 4.5% had someone living alone who was 65 years of age or older. The average household size was 2.82 and the average family size was 3.07.

In the borough the population was spread out, with 26.3% under the age of 18, 6.6% from 18 to 24, 32.4% from 25 to 44, 23.2% from 45 to 64, and 11.4% who were 65 years of age or older. The median age was 37 years. For every 100 females there were 96.8 males. For every 100 females age 18 and over, there were 93.1 males.

The median income for a household in the borough was $52,250, and the median income for a family was $60,000. Males had a median income of $38,125 versus $30,441 for females. The per capita income for the borough was $20,778. About 1.9% of families and 5.6% of the population were below the poverty line, including 5.9% of those under age 18 and 4.9% of those age 65 or over.

History

Trumbauersville was incorporated in 1908 and celebrated its centennial on May 2, 2008.

Climate

According to the Köppen climate classification system, Trumbauersville has a Hot-summer, Humid continental climate (Dfa). Dfa climates are characterized by at least one month having an average mean temperature ≤ , at least four months with an average mean temperature ≥ , at least one month with an average mean temperature ≥  and no significant precipitation difference between seasons. Although most summer days are slightly humid in Trumbauersville, episodes of heat and high humidity can occur with heat index values > . The average wettest month is July, which corresponds with the annual peak in thunderstorm activity. Episodes of extreme cold and wind can occur, with wind chill values < . Ice storms and large snowstorms depositing ≥  of snow occur once every few years, particularly during nor’easters from December through February.

Transportation

No numbered highways serve Trumbauersville directly. The main thoroughfares in the borough are Broad Street, which follows a southwest-northeast alignment, and Main Street, which follows a northwest-southeast route. These two roads intersect near the center of town.

Ecology

According to the A. W. Kuchler U.S. potential natural vegetation types, Trumbauersville would have a dominant vegetation type of Appalachian Oak (104) with a dominant vegetation form of Eastern Hardwood Forest (25). The spring bloom typically begins by April 15 and fall color usually peaks by October 25.

Education

Quakertown Community School District serves public school students in Trumbauersville. Trumbauersville Elementary School, in borough limits, serves students in grades K-5. The Sixth Grade Center serves students in sixth grade, Strayer Middle School serves grades 7-8, and Quakertown Community High School serves grades 9-12.

References

External links

 

Populated places established in 1908
Boroughs in Bucks County, Pennsylvania
1908 establishments in Pennsylvania